Panesthiinae is a subfamily of giant cockroaches (Blaberidae) mostly found in Indo-Malaysia and Australia.

Genera 

 Ancaudellia
 Annamoblatta
 Caeparia
 Microdina
 Miopanesthia
 Panesthia
 Salganea

References 

Insect subfamilies
Cockroaches
Fauna of Asia
Arthropods